Series 13 of Top Gear, a British motoring magazine and factual television programme, was broadcast in the United Kingdom on BBC Two during 2009, consisting of seven episodes that were aired between 21 June and 2 August. As a publicity stunt, the series also had Michael Schumacher disguise himself as "The Stig", primarily due to the fact that a car they reviewed could not be driven by anyone but Schumacher for a timed lap of the programme's test track. Alongside this, this series' highlights included a 1940s styled race, a motoring challenge involving rear-wheeled cars, and the presenters entering a classic car rally.  The thirteenth series received criticism over two elements - one for an advert designed by Jeremy Clarkson as part of a film for an episode; the other for the use of a word deemed offensive.

Episodes

"Schumacher is the Stig" stunt
On 20 June 2009, the day before Series 13 was to premiere, Jeremy Clarkson announced in his newspaper column that the Stig would be showing his face on the first episode of the new series, claiming that the Stig was "fed up with newspapers speculating that he's a photocopier salesman from Bolton, or lives in a pebble-dashed house in Bristol". During the episode, the Stig, who had been shown driving a black Ferrari FXX around the test track for a record-setting time of 1:10.7, walked into the studio, before joining Clarkson at the centre stage, whereupon, to chants from the audience of "Off! Off!", he removed his helmet and revealed himself to be F1 driver Michael Schumacher. In the subsequent interview, Schumacher exhibited some of the Stig's supposedly defining character traits, such as knowing only two facts about ducks that were both wrong. Before the episode ended, Clarkson showed a video clip of the Stig driving around in the Suzuki Liana, where he was shown to exhibit very poor car control, while striking a camera tripod, and eventually getting lost, leaving the presenter to conclude that Schumacher was not truly the Stig after all.

Following the episode's broadcast, the BBC would not confirm if the Schumacher being revealed as the Stig was merely a stunt for the show, but The Telegraph reported the following day that a spokesperson for the show had confirmed that Schumacher played the role of the Stig for the FXX's Power Lap, citing that Ferrari would not allow anyone, neither Ben Collins (the man in the role of the Stig at the time) or anyone else, to drive the £1million car other than Schumacher, further adding that "the identity of the driver at other times would remain 'a mystery'." The article notably revealed that others, like Schumacher, had also taken on the role of the Stig in place of whoever was performing the role on the show.

Criticism and controversy

Volkswagen Scirocco TDI advert film
During the final episode of the series, Jeremy Clarkson and James May were assigned to produce an advert for the new Volkswagen Scirocco, albeit a spoof of one. The segment received extensive complaints in regards to some of the content in it. One series of complaints was against a remake of a VW advertisement, which seemed to show the actor in it committing suicide on-screen, with Ofcom investigating and later ruling that there had been no editorial justification for its inclusion. The other series of complaints was directed against Clarkson's spoof ad, which showed crowds of Polish people leaving Warsaw in terror on buses and trains, because of the imminent German invasion of Poland, ending with the line "Volkswagen Scirocco TDI: Berlin to Warsaw in one tank".

"Pikey" comment
In an article for The Guardian, Jodie Matthews accused the show, particularly Jeremy Clarkson and Richard Hammond, of using the word "pikey" during the final episode when discussing about the saloons that Hammond had been reviewing, or alluding to it as Clarkson did by claiming that one of the saloons would be a "perfect car for anyone whose business is selling pegs and heather". She further stated in her article that it would popularise the racist term for Gypsies and Travellers, reinforce traveller stereotypes and legitimise past racist attitudes that had been deemed no longer appropriate, further commenting that she hoped rumours that the motoring show wouldn't be returning (at the time her article was published), turned out to be true.

References

2009 British television seasons
Top Gear seasons